Kevin Konar (born July 8, 1958 in Vancouver, British Columbia) is a former star linebacker for the BC Lions.

After playing his university football with the University of British Columbia, Konar would play 10 years with the Leos, from 1980 to 1989, and three Grey Cups (1983, 1985 and 1988) and one championship (in 1985). He was a CFL All Star two times.

References

BC Lions players
Canadian football linebackers
Canadian football people from Vancouver
University of British Columbia alumni
UBC Thunderbirds football players
1958 births
Living people
Players of Canadian football from British Columbia